Colgate is an unincorporated community in Steele County, North Dakota, United States.

Founding
The townsite was founded in 1882. A post office called Colgate was established in 1883, and remained in operation until 1972. The community has the namesake of  James Boorman Colgate, a prominent citizen who was the largest land owner with  that he bought from the Northern Pacific Railway.

Business

Colgate has three large businesses including 
Tsr Parts 
Trinidad Benham
Mewes farms

Schooling
There was a Colgate School District. But After the school closed in 1964 children began attending schools in Hope and Page (now the Hope-Page School District).

References

Unincorporated communities in Steele County, North Dakota
Unincorporated communities in North Dakota